Somi may refer to:

 Gabriel Somi (born 1991), Swedish-born Syrian footballer
 Jeon Somi (born 2001), Korean-Canadian singer
 Somi (American singer) (born 1981), American singer

See also
 SomiSomi Soft Serve & Taiyaki, U.S based chain of dessert restaurants